Hernan Berrato (born 14 April 1991) is an Argentine Paralympic athlete who competes in disability athletics in the T35 category. He won the gold medal for the 200 metres at the 2012 Paralympic Games for his category with a new World Record. Barreto has also competed at two World Championships winning double bronze at the Lyon Games in 2013.

References

Living people
1991 births
Paralympic athletes of Argentina
People from Zárate, Buenos Aires
Argentine male sprinters
Athletes (track and field) at the 2012 Summer Paralympics
Athletes (track and field) at the 2016 Summer Paralympics
Medalists at the 2012 Summer Paralympics
Medalists at the 2016 Summer Paralympics
Paralympic bronze medalists for Argentina
Paralympic medalists in athletics (track and field)
Medalists at the 2011 Parapan American Games
Medalists at the 2015 Parapan American Games
Medalists at the 2019 Parapan American Games
Medalists at the World Para Athletics Championships
Sportspeople from Buenos Aires Province
21st-century Argentine people